Picq is a surname. Notable people with the surname include:

 Ardant du Picq (1821–1870), French Army officer and military theorist 
 Charles Le Picq (1744–1806), French dancer and choreographer
 Pierre-Henri Picq, architect of St. Louis Cathedral, Fort-de-France
 Stéphane Picq (born 1965), French composer of video game music